Miguel de San Román Meza (May 17, 1802, Puno, Peru – April 3, 1863, Lima, Peru) served as the 14th President of Peru for a brief period between 1862 and 1863.

In 1822 he served under Simón Bolívar and participated in the Battle of Ayacucho. From there on, San Román participated in various battles during the first years of the Peruvian republican period. He supported Agustín Gamarra until his defeat in the battle of Ingavi.

Despite this defeat, San Román was awarded the grade of Gran Mariscal. He occupied the post of "President of the Council of State" between 1845 and 1849. He served as the President of the National convention from 1855 to 1856. In 1855 he was named Minister of War under Ramón Castilla, and later served as Prime Minister of Peru from July to October 1858. In 1862 he was elected as the President of Peru.

Miguel de San Román introduced the Peruvian Sol currency in 1863 and adopted the decimal system for standard weight and measures.

He died a couple of months after assuming power in the Lima district Chorrillos.

See also
 List of prime ministers of Peru
 List of presidents of Peru

References 

1802 births
1863 deaths
Presidents of Peru
Marshals of Peru
Presidents of the Congress of the Republic of Peru
Government ministers of Peru
People from Puno Region
Freemasons